Coats is a surname of English origin.

People surnamed Coats
A.W. (Bob) Coats (1924–2007), English economist, historian of economic thought
Amelia R. Coats, American printmaker 
Buck Coats (born 1982), American professional baseball player
Dan Coats (born 1943), American diplomat and politician; served as the Director of National Intelligence
Herbert P. Coats (1872–1932), New York state senator and Puerto Rico attorney general
James Coats (1894–1966), British skeleton racer
John Coats (1906–1979), Scottish theosophist; bishop of the Liberal Catholic Church
Michael Coats (born 1946), American NASA astronaut
Robert H. Coats (1874–1960), Canadian statistician
Robert R. Coats (1910–1995), Canadian-American geologist
Stuart Coats (1868–1959), British politician; MP for Wimbledon and East Surrey
Thomas Coats  (1809-1893), made Paisley, Scotland, the world center for thread making.

See also
Coats baronets, in the Baronetage of the United Kingdom
Glen-Coats baronets, in the Baronetage of the United Kingdom
Coates (surname)
Cotes (disambiguation)

English-language surnames